Zangiabad is a city in Kerman Province, Iran.

Zangiabad or Zengiabad may also refer to various places in Iran:
Zangiabad, East Azerbaijan
Zangiabad, Fars
Zangiabad, Shahr-e Babak, Kerman Province
Zangiabad, South Khorasan
Zangiabad, West Azerbaijan
Zangiabad Rural District, in Kerman Province